Glen Urquhart High School is a six-year comprehensive secondary school situated in Drumnadrochit. The school's primary catchment area ranges from Abriachan in the north to Invermoriston in the south, and as far west as Cannich and Tomich. Its associated Primary schools are Glenurquhart, Balnain and Cannich Bridge.

History
Glenurquhart Public School was established in 1877 in the Culanloan area of Drumnadrochit. A secondary department was later added in 1893 with Benjamin Skinner given responsibility for organising the secondary curriculum. A new building was constructed for the primary department in 1975, and since 1980 Glenurquhart Primary School has existed as a separate entity. After over a century in the Culanloan building, the school moved into a new building in 2002. The design of the new building is nearly identical to that of Ardnamurchan High School as they were built at a similar time.

Notable former students and staff
 A.C. MacKell, O.B.E. (Head Teacher)
 Peter English, scientist, shinty player and social historian
 Michael Fraser, footballer and shinty player
 Fraser MacKenzie, journalist and shinty player
 Eddie Tembo, shinty player
 Stuart MacKintosh, shinty player and musician
 Anna Nelson, athletics

References

Secondary schools in Highland (council area)
1893 establishments in Scotland
Educational institutions established in 1893